William Marsden may refer to:
 William Marsden (diplomat) (1940–2019), former British Ambassador to Argentina and Costa Rica
 William Marsden (orientalist) (1754–1836), the British First Secretaries to the Admiralty. Also an orientalist, linguist and numismatist

 William Marsden (sport shooter) (1860–1942), British Olympic sport shooter

 William Marsden (surgeon) (1796–1867), English surgeon
 William Marsden (footballer, born 1871) (1871–1943), English footballer
 Billy Marsden (1901–1983), English international footballer
 William Milnes Marsden (1873–1956), British solicitor and philatelist
 William Marsden (reporter), author and investigative reporter/assistant city editor for The Gazette (Montreal)